Will Crewdson is a London-based guitarist/writer/producer best known for his work with the UK band Rachel Stamp, US singer Johnette Napolitano and Adam Ant.

Career

Rachel Stamp
Crewdson spent 10 years touring and recording with the rock band Rachel Stamp which, at one point, became the only unsigned band to sell out the London Astoria. They also played gigs with Iggy Pop, Korn, No Doubt, The Tubes and Cheap Trick, among others. They had several record deals, the biggest of which was with WEA.

Collaboration with Johnette Napolitano
After this period, Crewdson concentrated on writing and recording with Johnette Napolitano, the former singer with LA legends Concrete Blonde. The critically acclaimed Napolitano solo album Scarred was released on Hybrid Recordings in 2007. He also collaborated with the US director/writer Tom DiCillo as one half of The Black and Blue Orkestre.

Adam Ant guitarist
In 2010, Crewdson played live, recorded and musically directed for Adam Ant's solo band. Gigs included a sell-out show at London's Scala. He also helped organize a tribute to the late Adam and the Ants guitarist, Matthew Ashman again at the London Scala on 21 November 2010. Crewdson played lead guitar on the night with the remaining members of Ashman's bands, Bow Wow Wow and Chiefs of Relief (featuring Paul Cook from Sex Pistols on drums and Billy Morrison on vocals) as well as performing another set with Adam Ant.

Support tour work
He also continues to work in the USA with long-term collaborator LIVAN and has completed support tours with this artist opening for Alice Cooper, Aerosmith and Peter Murphy.

As well as these projects, Crewdson has also played guitar for the following: Bow Wow Wow, Malcolm McLaren, Tom Jones, Bryan Ferry, Martin Degville, Celine Dion, Appleton, Pigface, Tyler James, T-Rexstasy and Dragons.

Flesh for Lulu
In 2013, Nick Marsh announced that he was forming a new line-up of Flesh for Lulu which included Crewdson on guitar.

Rejoining Adam Ant
Crewdson rejoined Adam Ant in early 2014 as joint lead guitarist for his UK live shows which included a one-off Hammersmith Apollo gig. Ant's classic Dirk Wears White Sox album was played in its entirety at this show, which was later released as the concert DVD Dirk Live At The Apollo. He was also featured in Jack Bond's full-length documentary about Ant, The Blueblack Hussar which was released on DVD in July 2014.  Crewdson was sole guitarist for Ant following the sudden death of bandmate Tom Edwards during a US tour in January 2017 until the recruitment of replacement Adam Leach later that year.

The Selecter
In 2015, Crewdson joined The Selecter on guitar and also released his first album with electrorock duo She Made Me Do It which features Shaheena Dax from Rachel Stamp on vocals.

Solo work
Crewdson has also released seven solo albums under the name Scant Regard. This is mainly instrumental electronic-led guitar-driven music taking in influences from punk, techno, dub, surf style rock'n'roll and Spaghetti Western soundtracks sometimes featuring guest vocalists.

References

External links
Official site
Scant Regard @ Facebook
Rachel Stamp @ Myspace
Adam Ant
The Black and Blue Orkestre @ Myspace

English rock guitarists
English male guitarists
Living people
Year of birth missing (living people)
The Selecter members
Dragons (band) members